Wapedia was a mobile version of Wikipedia. It was started in August 2004 by Florian Amrhein and shut down on 4 November 2013. It was operated by Taptu.

Wapedia was originally a Wireless Application Protocol (WAP) site for use on mobile phones of the very early 2000s. The URL for Wapedia was http://wapedia.mobi/  (which was one of the early examples of a .mobi website). Over time, HTML interfaces were added, with the site generating pages optimised for a variety of mobile devices such as smart phones, Personal digital assistants (PDAs), and tablets. In 2009 dedicated applications for iPhone, Android and WebOS were launched.

Wapedia served articles using a combination of a proxy-like behavior and a local article database. It did not offer the ability to edit pages. Wapedia injected adverts into the Wikipedia articles, either in the HTML or in the applications.

See also
 Help:Mobile access

References

External links

 

Android (operating system) software
Discontinued iOS software
Websites which mirror Wikipedia
2004 software
Computer-related introductions in 2004